The Karmiel railway station is an Israel Railways passenger terminal in Karmiel, Israel. It is located at the eastern terminus of the Railway to Karmiel (which at its western end connects to the Coastal Railway at a point just south of Acre (Akko) – where it heads south towards Haifa). The next station to the west is Ahihud. The station (as well as the rest of the Karmiel line) was opened on 20 September 2017.

The station is located at the northern entrance to Karmiel, off of Highway 85, and is situated next to the Karmiel central bus station.

References

Railway stations in Northern District (Israel)
Railway stations opened in 2017
2017 establishments in Israel